Daphnella clathrata is a species of sea snail, a marine gastropod mollusk in the family Raphitomidae.

Distribution
This marine species occurs off Santa Catalina Island, California, USA.

References

External links
 

clathrata
Gastropods described in 1865